Duane Edgar Dewey (November 16, 1931 – October 11, 2021) was an American combat Marine. He received the United States military's highest decoration for valor, the Medal of Honor, for his actions on April 16, 1952, during the Korean War. Although wounded by an enemy grenade, he smothered another exploding grenade with his own body to save the life of a corpsman and the other Marines around him.

Early life and education
Dewey was born on November 16, 1931, in Grand Rapids, Michigan and died October 11, 2021, at the age of 89 in St. Augustine, Florida and was buried with full military honors at the Florida National Cemetery at Bushnell, Florida. He attended school in Muskegon until 1947. He then worked for six months on a farm in South Haven, and for a year as a foundry worker at National Motor Casting (formerly Marshall Casting), also in South Haven.

Marine Corps
Dewey signed with the United States Marine Corps Reserve on March 7, 1951, for an "'indefinite' enlistment — the duration of the war plus six months." He completed recruit training at the Marine Corps Recruit Depot Parris Island, South Carolina, and underwent intensive combat training at Camp Pendleton, California.

Dewey embarked for Korea in September 1951. He participated in the United Nations summer-fall offensive of 1951 and the second winter of Korean fighting. Corporal Dewey earned the Medal of Honor on April 16, 1952, near Panmunjom, while serving as leader of a machine gun squad with Company E, 5th Marines, 1st Marine Division. He had been wounded by a grenade that had exploded at his feet, and was being treated by a navy medical corpsman when an enemy grenade landed at the squad's position. Yanking the corpsman to the ground and warning members of the squad, Dewey flung himself on the grenade shouting, "Doc, I got it in my hip pocket!" The grenade exploded, lifting Dewey off the ground and inflicting "gaping shrapnel wounds throughout the lower part of his body". In addition, he sustained a bullet wound to the stomach.

After treatment of his wounds in Korea, Dewey was evacuated to the United States Naval Hospital in Yokosuka, Japan, and then to the naval hospitals at Mare Island, California, and Great Lakes, Illinois. Following his recuperation at Great Lakes, he was released from active duty on August 19, 1952.

On March 12, 1953, Dewey was the first person to receive the Medal of Honor from President Dwight D. Eisenhower. After presenting the medal to Dewey during the ceremony at the White House, Eisenhower said to him, "You must have a body of steel."

Awards and decorations
Dewey's military awards include:

Medal of Honor
 
The President of the United States takes pride in presenting the MEDAL OF HONOR to

for service as set forth in the following

CITATION:

/S/ DWIGHT D. EISENHOWER

See also

List of Korean War Medal of Honor recipients

Notes

References

1931 births
2021 deaths
People from Grand Rapids, Michigan
Military personnel from Michigan
United States Marine Corps personnel of the Korean War
Korean War recipients of the Medal of Honor
United States Marine Corps Medal of Honor recipients
United States Marine Corps non-commissioned officers
United States Marine Corps reservists